Thomas Massie (born around 1675 in either Virginia or Cheshire, England) was a planter, politician, militia officer, a Justice of New Kent County, and vestryman in colonial Virginia. At the time of his death around 1731, he owned 4,000 acres of land in New Kent County, Virginia near the Little Byrd Creek in what is now Goochland County, Virginia as part of his family's Windsor Forest Plantation, which he inherited from his father.

Biography
Thomas Massie (around 1675-1732) to Peter Massie (1639/1640-1719) and his wife Penelope Massie (née Cooper), rumored to be the illegitimate daughter of Anthony Ashley-Cooper, 1st Earl of Shaftesbury. Thomas's father, Peter, who migrated to the Virginia colony sometime in the 1600s from Cheshire in England was a nephew of Edward Massie, and a planter who served as surveyor of the highways in New Kent County from 1708 until his death in 1719. He was also the owner and founder of the Windsor Forest Plantation located near the Chickahominy river in the same county after he was granted 1,155 acres of land in 1690.

Thomas married Mary Massie (née Walker) on November 23, 1698 in New Kent, County. Mary was the great-granddaughter of reverend and lawyer Samuel Thomas Walker, a survivor of the Indian massacre of 1622 at Jamestown, together Thomas and Mary had eleven children, including their son William Massie who would also go on to serve as a member of the House of Burgess representing New Kent County. Massie served as a vestryman for St. Peter's Parish beginning in 1704 and as a captain in the New Kent Co. Militia of the Virginia Militia until his service as a member of the Virginia House of Burgesses from 1722 until 1726. After serving in the House of Burgesses, Massie would go on to serve as Justice of the Peace for New Kent County from 1723 until 1729.

References

1675 births
1731 deaths
Date of birth uncertain
House of Burgesses members
People from New Kent County, Virginia
American planters
Colonial American justices of the peace